The Constitution of 1925 was the constitution in force in Chile between 1925 and 1973 when the Government Junta suspended it. In the 1920s Chile had a severe social and economic crisis that led to the loss of prestige for old ruling class, labeled oligarchy in Chilean historiography, and the rise of a more sensibilized populist government led by Arturo Alessandri. In 1924 Alessandri was outed in a coup, but was called back in 1925 to complete his mandate. Alessandri then used his presidency to draft a new constitution to replace the Constitution of 1833.  The constitution was approved by plebiscite by 134,421 voters on August 30 of 1925. Prominent features of the constitution were:

 Separation of the church from the state. This was the fulfillment of an old goal among many liberals in Chile. This issue had caused a series of conflicts and controversies in the 19th century. 
 Legislative initiative powers to the president. (Reinforced with subsequent reforms)
 Created an electoral tribunal. This reform increased the democratization of elections that were still manipulated in large parts of the country.

Principal reforms
 1943: Creation of Comptroller General of Chile (Contraloría General de la República).
 1963: Authorization of the Agrarian Land Reform (reinforced in 1967). 
 1970: Creation of Constitutional Court.
 1970: Democratic Guarantee Statute, to ensure better democratic freedoms.
 1971: Expropriation of Great Mining Copper Industry.

References

Constitution
Defunct constitutions
Constitutions of Chile

External links